Jakub of Żnin was an early archbishop of Gniezno in Poland. He was archbishop from c. 1124 until 1148.

Although the twelfth century was a formative time for the Polish state, the historical records of the time are sparse and there is much that is not known about him.

It was during his time as Bishop that Innocent II issues a bull giving the metropolitan power over Poland to the Archbishopric of Magdeburg. This was annulled in 1136 when Innocent II restored as Gniezno with archbishop authority.

His death was recorded in the Lubiński obituary on the day of 23 September.
On 7 July 1136 Pope Innocent II granted Archbishop Jacob twenty-nine villages in Pałuki and the town of Żnin, which also became property of the Roman Catholic Church.

References

External links
 Poland and the papacy before the second crusade

Archbishops of Gniezno
11th-century births
1148 deaths